John Brisben Walker (September 10, 1847 – July 7, 1931) was a  magazine publisher and automobile entrepreneur in the United States. In his later years, he was a resident of Jefferson County, Colorado.

Biography 
Walker was born on September 10, 1847 at his parents' country house on the Monongahela River, near Pittsburgh, Pennsylvania.

In 1872, Walker arrived in Charleston, West Virginia and purchased much land from the Elk river west to a line which ran from the Kanawha river near the end of the present Delaware Avenue to about the end of Fayette Street at West Washington Street, and extending from the Kanawha river to he present West Washington street. This he designated as the J.B. Walker addition to the City of Charleston, but it was commonly called the West End.  Walker laid off this section into a town site, with streets running  in one direction and avenues in another. He named the streets for West Virginia counties, and the avenues for other states. His original plans, with a few changes in names, but little other variation, are still the plans of that part of the city.  Walker's land failed to make a profit, and so he moved to New York to try his hand at another venture.         

In 1889 he purchased Cosmopolitan Magazine, leading it to marked growth before selling it to William Randolph Hearst in 1905. The 1905 sale price has been variously reported as $400,000 and $1,000,000. He was a co-founder of the Locomobile Company of America and established the Mobile Company of America in 1899. 

Moving to Colorado, Walker donated  in Denver to the Jesuits in 1887. The Jesuits built what is now Regis University upon that .

In the first decade of the twentieth century, Walker had a vision of artists performing on a stage nestled in the perfectly acoustic surroundings of Red Rocks. Walker produced several concerts between 1906 and 1910 on a temporary platform; and out of his dream, the history of Red Rocks as an entertainment venue began. In addition to the platform, Walker also built the Mount Morrison Cable Incline funicular railway which carried tourists from a base at what is today the parking lot of the amphitheatre up to enjoy the view from the top of Mount Morrison; the incline operated for about five years beginning in 1909.

John Walker built a home in 1909 atop Mt. Falcon (a mountain slightly west of Denver, Colorado).  The house was struck by lightning and was ruined in 1918.  He attempted to build a summer white house for the President around 1911.  When his attempts to raise money to continue the building failed, the project was abandoned.

Walker died on July 7, 1931 in Brooklyn, New York City.

Walker was married three times; his third wife was the prominent suffragette Iris Calderhead.

See also
Freelan Oscar Stanley & Francis Edgar Stanley
Stanley Motor Carriage Company
Mobile Company of America

References

Images

1847 births
1931 deaths
American magazine publishers (people)
American founders of automobile manufacturers
Cosmopolitan (magazine) editors
19th-century American businesspeople